The Assyrian Mastiff, was a landrace in Assyria. This dog was often used as a livestock guardian against predators and they were bred by the Assyrians and Babylonians for lion and wild horse-hunting.
 
The name is most likely derived from the images of this type of dog that appear in Assyrian and other Mesopotamian reliefs dating from the 10th to 6th century BCE Neo-Assyrian Empire.

History 
It is assumed the Assyrian mastiff had their ancestors in the region between India and Persia where they were domesticated and used as hunting dogs. Several mastiff type figures were discovered with carved-in names such as 'Consume his life', 'Don't stop to think, bite',  'or 'Catcher of the hostile one' were discovered of the Assyrian era around 2000 BC. More Assyrian relics depicting dogs can be found from between 1000 to 650 BC.

Description 
In 1886, M.B. Wynn described the ancient Assyrian's clay tablet's depictions of the Assyrian Mastiff:

See also
Assyria
List of dog breeds
Mesopotamia
Dogs portal

References

Livestock guardian dogs
Rare dog breeds